In Greek mythology, Dicaeus or Dikaios was a son of Poseidon  and brother was Syleus. They lived near the Mountain Pelion in Thessaly.

Mythology 
Dicaeus hosted Herakles. Unlike Syleus, who was killed by Herakles, Dicaeus was a just man, which was suggested by the very literal meaning of his name (Δίκαιος = Just).

The Dicaea city in Thrace was named after him.

Notes

References 

 Conon, Fifty Narrations, surviving as one-paragraph summaries in the Bibliotheca (Library) of Photius, Patriarch of Constantinople translated from the Greek by Brady Kiesling. Online version at the Topos Text Project.
 Stephanus of Byzantium, Stephani Byzantii Ethnicorum quae supersunt, edited by August Meineike (1790-1870), published 1849. A few entries from this important ancient handbook of place names have been translated by Brady Kiesling. Online version at the Topos Text Project.

Children of Poseidon
Mythology of Heracles